Erson Stiven Dias Costa (born 22 January 1993), simply known as Kukula,  is a Cape Verdean professional footballer who plays for Portuguese Second League club Sporting Covilhã as a forward. In the 2012–13 season he scored his first goal in Liga Sagres against Moreirense. In July 2020, Kukula signed a two-year contract with Bulgarian club Beroe Stara Zagora.

References

External links

1993 births
Living people
Cape Verdean footballers
Association football forwards
People from Santo Antão, Cape Verde
C.S. Marítimo players
C.D. Feirense players
F.C. Vizela players
Leixões S.C. players
S.C. Covilhã players
PFC Beroe Stara Zagora players
Liga Portugal 2 players
Primeira Liga players
Cypriot First Division players
First Professional Football League (Bulgaria) players
Cape Verdean expatriate footballers
Cape Verdean expatriate sportspeople in Portugal
Cape Verdean expatriate sportspeople in Cyprus
Cape Verdean expatriate sportspeople in Bulgaria
Expatriate footballers in Portugal
Expatriate footballers in Cyprus
Expatriate footballers in Bulgaria